is a Japanese actress and voice actress from Tokyo, Japan.

Biography

Filmography

Anime

Original video animation (OVA)

Video games

Dubbing

Narration

References

External links
 

1965 births
Living people
Japanese video game actresses
Japanese voice actresses
Voice actresses from Tokyo